Entiat  is a city in Chelan County, Washington, United States. It is part of the Wenatchee−East Wenatchee Metropolitan Statistical Area. The population was 1,326 at the 2020 census. 

The name "Entiat" refers to the indigenous Entiat people, whose name comes from the Moses-Columbian Salishan word /nt'yátkʷ/, [nt'iátkʷ], "place of grassy water", from /na-/, "place", /st'íyaʔ/, "tall grass, hay", and /-atkʷ/, "water".

History
In 1877, the first white settler arrived in the Entiat Valley, Lewis Detwiler. The first public school was established in Entiat in 1891. In 1895 the first Entiat Post Office was established. In 1903 the Chief of the Entiat Indian tribe, Shil-how-Saskt (Silico Saska) died. The Entiat Power Plant opened for business in 1908. The Keystone Fruit Company opened for business in the valley in 1910. E.P. Murphy began publishing the Entiat Times in 1913, and railroad service began in Entiat in 1914. In 1915 a second fire threatened the "first" town of Entiat and only six businesses survived. The Entiat school opened in 1916 in its current location. In 1921 the "second" town of Entiat was secured, as the remaining buildings of town "one" burned down. In 1920, the tradition of Numeral Mountain began as High School seniors painted their graduation class number on the Mountainside across the Entiat River from the school.  Entiat was officially incorporated on April 25, 1944.  In 1960, Rocky Reach Dam was constructed downriver from Entiat, much of the town had to be relocated to higher ground due to the rising waters behind the dam. Most of the original buildings were razed or moved to a location north of the original town. The "third" town of Entiat was "officially" open for business in 1961. The new Entiat Park re-opened for camping on Friday, May 22, 2015 after being closed for over a year.

Geography
Entiat is located at the confluence of the Entiat and Columbia rivers.  This section of the Columbia is known as Lake Entiat.  This is the reservoir formed behind Rocky Reach Dam.  The town is situated between the eastern foothills of the Cascade Mountain range, Lake Entiat and the Entiat River.
Entiat is located at  (47.677640, -120.213149).

Climate

Demographics

2010 census
As of the census of 2010, there were 1,112 people, 421 households, and 305 families residing in the city. The racial makeup of the city was 81.5% White, 0.4% African American, 0.4% Native American, 0.2% Asian, 0.4% Pacific Islander, 13.8% from other races, and 3.3% from two or more races. Hispanic or Latino of any race were 20.7% of the population.

There were 421 households, of which 33.5% had children under the age of 18 living with them, 54.4% were married couples living together, 10.2% had a female householder with no husband present, 7.8% had a male householder with no wife present, and 27.6% were non-families. 20.7% of all households were made up of individuals, and 7.4% had someone living alone who was 65 years of age or older. The average household size was 2.64 and the average family size was 2.99.

The median age in the city was 40.1 years. 25.3% of residents were under the age of 18; 8.4% were between the ages of 18 and 24; 22.1% were from 25 to 44; 29.7% were from 45 to 64; and 14.4% were 65 years of age or older. The gender makeup of the city was 51.5% male and 48.5% female.

2000 census
As of the census of 2000, there were 957 people, 342 households, and 244 families residing in the city. The population density was 700.6 people per square mile (269.7/km2). There were 400 housing units at an average density of 292.8 per square mile (112.7/km2). The racial makeup of the city was 79.31% White, 0.52% African American, 1.67% Native American, 0.21% Asian, 16.51% from other races, and 1.78% from two or more races. Hispanic or Latino of any race were 22.57% of the population.

There were 342 households, out of which 38.6% had children under the age of 18 living with them, 57.9% were married couples living together, 7.3% had a female householder with no husband present, and 28.4% were non-families. 21.3% of all households were made up of individuals, and 7.9% had someone living alone who was 65 years of age or older. The average household size was 2.80 and the average family size was 3.27.

In the city, the age distribution of the population shows 32.5% under the age of 18, 8.0% from 18 to 24, 27.6% from 25 to 44, 21.6% from 45 to 64, and 10.2% who were 65 years of age or older. The median age was 33 years. For every 100 females, there were 96.9 males. For every 100 females age 18 and over, there were 97.6 males.

The median income for a household in the city was $33,450, and the median income for a family was $37,083. Males had a median income of $33,487 versus $21,324 for females. The per capita income for the city was $13,529. About 9.1% of families and 14.0% of the population were below the poverty line, including 14.4% of those under age 18 and 5.7% of those age 65 or over.

References

External links
 City of Entiat, WA
 Entiat School District

Cities in Chelan County, Washington
Cities in Washington (state)
Washington placenames of Native American origin
Washington (state) populated places on the Columbia River
Wenatchee–East Wenatchee metropolitan area